Mirjana Lučić-Baroni (born 9 March 1982) is a Croatian former professional tennis player. She enjoyed a meteoric rise on the WTA Tour in the late 1990s, during which she set several "youngest-ever" records. She captured the women's doubles title at the 1998 Australian Open when she was 15 years old, partnered with Martina Hingis. She also won the first ever professional tournament she entered, the 1997 Croatian Ladies Open, and defended it the following year at age 16, making her the youngest player in history to successfully defend a title. She then reached the semifinals of the 1999 Wimbledon Championships, beating world No. 4, Monica Seles, and eighth seed Nathalie Tauziat, the previous year's finalist, before she lost to Steffi Graf in three sets. Following a series of personal problems from 2000 onwards, she faded from the scene.

After toiling on the ITF Women's Circuit through much of the next decade, Lučić re-emerged as a WTA regular following the 2010 season. In September 2014, she upset world No. 2 Simona Halep in the third round of the US Open. The following week, she beat Venus Williams at the Tournoi de Québec final to claim the title, which set the record for the longest gap between titles in the Open Era. In January 2017, almost 18 years after her first Grand Slam semifinal, Lučić-Baroni reached the semifinals of the Australian Open, upsetting two top-5-ranked players before losing to Serena Williams. Three months later, she entered the singles rankings' top 20 for the first time in her career. Lučić-Baroni has been inactive since January 2018 due to a shoulder injury.

Career

Junior success
Lučić began playing tennis at age 4 by hiding in the car when her older sister went to tennis classes and then sneaking into the lessons herself. As a junior player, she won the girls' singles title at the US Open in 1996, and singles and doubles crowns at the Australian Open in 1997, becoming the third player in the open era to win two junior Grand Slam singles titles before her 15th birthday (others being Martina Hingis and Jennifer Capriati).

1997–98: Grand Slam title
Lučić turned professional in April 1997 at the age of 15. One week after turning pro, she won the first WTA Tour event she played in at Bol. She then reached the final of her second career event in Strasbourg, where she lost to Steffi Graf.

In 1998, playing in her first tour doubles event, Lučić became the youngest player in history to win a title at the Australian Open at the age of 15 years, 10 months and 21 days, when she and Hingis won the women's doubles title. The win made Lučić the first player to win both the first singles and doubles events they had ever played in on the WTA Tour. She went on to win the second doubles event of her career when she partnered with Hingis to win the Pan Pacific Open in Tokyo. Later that year, Lučić defended her singles title at Bol, becoming the youngest player ever to defend a tour title at age 16 years, one month and 24 days. Partnering with Mahesh Bhupathi, she also finished runner-up in the 1998 mixed-doubles event of Wimbledon.

1999: Wimbledon semifinal, personal problems
In 1999, Lučić achieved her career-best Grand Slam singles performance when she reached the semifinals at Wimbledon, before losing in three sets to Graf. She beat Erika deLone and Mariana Díaz Oliva before she beat world No. 4 and nine-time Grand Slam champion Monica Seles in the third round. She saw off Tamarine Tanasugarn and then beat 1998 Wimbledon finalist Nathalie Tauziat in the quarterfinals, after Tauziat served for the match twice in the third set.

After 1999, Lučić suffered a series of personal and financial problems and failed to make any further significant impact on the tour.  She said that she had been abused by her father, Marinko, from early childhood. She continued to compete until the 2003 US Open, then proceeded to take an extended hiatus from competition; her career-high rankings were world No. 32 in singles and No. 19 in doubles (both achieved in 1998). She played only two tournaments in the 2004, 2005, and 2006 seasons combined.

2007–08: Return to tour
Lučić gave an interview in the New York Daily News in April 2006, explaining why she stopped playing and describing her life with an abusive father, vowing that would not stop her and she would continue to fight to the end. She had been training with a new coach, Ivan Beroš, and said she was fit and ready to continue tennis.

As a wildcard in the qualifying draw of the Cellular South Cup in Memphis in February, Lučić won one match (defeating Melanie Oudin) before losing in the second round to Natalie Grandin. She was also awarded a wildcard to the Indian Wells Open in March, where she again won her first match before losing in the second round.

She also received a wildcard to the Tiro A Volo tournament in Rome, where she lost in the first round to Karin Knapp. That was her third tournament within the previous 12 months, and she received her first WTA ranking (No. 524) since her return to the professional tour.

Even though she lost the first round to Knapp in the $100k Rome Challenger, she received a qualifying wildcard for the 1,300k WTA tournament in May at the same city and beat the 65th-ranked player in the world, Elena Vesnina. She then went on to lose to Catalina Castaño in the second round. Her ranking fell to 444 with the result.

Lučić played a mixture of ITF and WTA qualifiers in 2008, her best result reaching the quarterfinals in Florence in May. In September 2008, Mirjana started working with her new coach Alberto Gutierrez, planning to play a full schedule the following year.

2009–11
In the 2009 season, she was given a wildcard into the Auckland Open in New Zealand. In her first WTA Tour main-draw match since 2007 Indian Wells, she lost to Anne Keothavong in the first round.

Lučić then continued to toil on the ITF Circuit for several years prior to mounting somewhat of a comeback in the 2010 season. During that year, Lučić won her first title in 12 years at a $25k event in Jackson, Florida on 11 April. Shortly after, Lučić qualified for the WTA event in Birmingham, going on to win her first main-draw match since 2007 in Indian Wells, this time over Colombian Mariana Duque. She continued her good form as she defeated fellow Croatian player Karolina Šprem in the second round. She was beaten by top-20 player Aravane Rezaï of France in the third round. Lučić then competed in the Wimbledon qualifying tournament in Roehampton. She won her first two rounds and beat Michaëlla Krajicek in the third round to qualify for the main draw of Wimbledon, her first Grand Slam since the 2002 US Open. After a good showing, she fell to 14th seed Victoria Azarenka in the first round on centre court.

After Wimbledon, Lučić moved onto the European summer clay-court events. She failed to qualify for the Swedish Open in Båstad but the following week came through three rounds of qualifying at Palermo event, and won her first round match, defeating Pauline Parmentier recovering from a 0–4 third set deficit and saving three match points. She then fell to third seed Sara Errani in the second round recovering a 2–4 deficit to force a tie-break before falling 0–6, 6–7. Her ranking rose to No. 151.

Following Palermo, Lučić returned to the United States for the summer hard-court season. Her first event was the Premier event in Stanford, the Bank of the West Classic. Seeded fifth in the qualifying draw, Lučić defeated both Heidi El Tabakh and Tamaryn Hendler in straight sets before repeating her Wimbledon victory over Michaëlla Krajicek with a straight-sets win to qualify for the main draw where she lost to Maria Kirilenko.

In the US Open, after winning three qualifying matches to enter the main draw, she beat Alicia Molik to set up a second round clash with No. 4 seed Jelena Janković. Lučić lost in three sets. Even with this defeat, this was her best performance in a Grand Slam championship for nearly a decade.

Lučić started out the 2011 season poorly with a string of early losses on both the WTA Tour and ITF Circuit early in the year. Her fortunes began to change during the clay court season where Lučić reached her first WTA quarterfinal in over ten years at the Strasbourg event, losing to Anabel Medina Garrigues. She married restaurateur Daniele Baroni in December 2011.

2012
Lučić-Baroni began the new season losing in qualifying at Brisbane and Sydney in January. She also failed to qualify for the Australian Open. She struggled to find her form, losing early at the tournaments in Midland and Memphis, as well as the Premier line-up events of Indian Wells, Miami and Charleston. She also lost in the first round at Roland Garros to Svetlana Kuznetsova.

Lučić-Baroni had a breakthrough run at Wimbledon, reaching the third round as a qualifier. She stunned ninth seed Marion Bartoli en route to the second round. However, her run was ended by Roberta Vinci in a tight match.

2014: US Open fourth round, first titles in 16 years
At the Wimbledon Championships, Lučić-Baroni faced former No. 1 Victoria Azarenka in the first round but lost to the Belarusian in straight sets, after having set points in the second set.

A few weeks later, a resurgent Lučić-Baroni made major waves at the US Open. She defeated No. 25 seed Garbiñe Muguruza in the first round, and Shahar Pe'er in the second round to gain a berth in the third round for the first time since 1998. She then pulled off a huge upset, stunning second-seed Simona Halep in straight sets to win a spot in the round of 16—the best result of her career at this tournament, and her best showing at a Grand Slam since reaching the semifinals at Wimbledon in 1999. She went on to lose this round to 13th seed Sara Errani in three sets.

However, only two weeks later, she entered the Quebec City event and reached the singles final, where she pulled off another major upset by beating Venus Williams on 14 September, setting a record for the longest gap between titles in WTA history, as her previous win happened 16 years and four months earlier at the 1998 Bol Ladies Open. In addition, paired with Czech player Lucie Hradecká, she won the doubles final of the tournament on the same day.

2015–16

In 2015, Lučić-Baroni had a second consecutive finish in the top 100 of the WTA rankings, ending the season ranked No. 67. Her best performance was reaching the semifinals of Quebec City.

In 2016, she reached the final of the Strasbourg event, where she lost in straight sets to Caroline Garcia.

2017: Return to a Grand Slam semifinal and career-high ranking
Mirjana entered the Australian Open ranked 79 in the world. In the first round, she beat Wang Qiang in three sets to advance into the second round where she upset the third-seed Agnieszka Radwańska in straight sets. In the third round she defeated Maria Sakkari in three sets. In the fourth round, she defeated qualifier Jennifer Brady in straight sets to advance to the quarterfinals where she pulled another major upset, beating Karolína Plíšková, a heavy favorite to win the tournament in three tight sets where she made her first Australian Open semifinals and her first semifinal appearance since she did so in the 1999 Wimbledon Championships 18 years ago. She then proceeded to lose in two sets against six-time Australian Open champion and No. 2 seed Serena Williams. She reached her highest ranking of No. 29 on 30 January, eclipsing her previous best of No. 32 set in May 1998.
On 1 May, she cracked the top 20 for the first time.

2018
At the Brisbane International, Lučić-Baroni lost in the second round to last year finalist Alizé Cornet.

2021: Comeback plans
In March 2021, Lučić-Baroni announced her continued plans for a comeback in order to conclude her career on her own terms.

Performance timelines

Win–loss includes only WTA Tour and Grand Slam tournaments main-draw results.

Singles

Doubles

Grand Slam finals

Women's doubles: 1 (title)

Mixed doubles: 1 (runner-up)

WTA career finals

Singles: 5 (3 titles, 2 runner-ups)

Doubles: 4 (3 titles, 1 runner-up)

ITF Circuit finals

Singles: 7 (4–3)

Doubles: 3 (3–0)

Head-to-head records

Record against top 10 players
{|class="sortable wikitable" style=text-align:center
|Player
|width=80 |Record
|width=70 |Win%
|width=80 bgcolor=CCCCFF|Hard
|width=80 bgcolor=EBC2AF|Clay
|width=80 bgcolor=CCFFCC|Grass
|width=80 bgcolor=thistle|Carpet
|Last match
|-bgcolor=efefef
| align=left | Number 1 ranked players|| colspan="8" |
|-
| align=left |  Simona Halep
| 2–0
| bgcolor=lime|
| 1–0
| 1–0
| –
| –
| bgcolor=ccffcc align=left|Won (7–5, 6–1) at 2015 French Open
|-
| align=left |  Monica Seles
| 1–0
| bgcolor=lime|
| –
| –
| 1–0
| –
| bgcolor=ccffcc align=left|Won (7–6(7–4), 7–6(7–4)) at 1999 Wimbledon
|-
| align=left |  Ana Ivanovic
| 1–1
| bgcolor=99ccff|
| –
| 1–0
| 0–1
| –
| bgcolor=ebc2af align=left|Lost (3–6, 4–6) at 2011 Birmingham
|-
| align=left |  Karolína Plíšková
| 3–4
| bgcolor=eee8AA|
| 2–4
| –
| 1–0
| –
| bgcolor=ebc2af align=left|Lost (3–6, 4–6) at 2017 Miami
|-
| align=left |  Garbiñe Muguruza
| 1–2
| bgcolor=eee8AA|
| 1–1
| –
| 0–1
| –
| bgcolor=ebc2af align=left|Lost (6–1, 2–6, 1–6) at 2015 Beijing
|-
| align=left |  Maria Sharapova
| 1–2
| bgcolor=eee8AA|
| –
| 1–2
| –
| –
| bgcolor=ccffcc align=left|Won (6–4, 3–6, 1–2, ret.) at 2017 Rome
|-
| align=left |  Venus Williams
| 1–2
| bgcolor=eee8AA|
| 0–2
| –
| –
| 1–0
| bgcolor=ccffcc align=left|Won (6–4, 6–3) at 2014 Quebec City
|-
| align=left |  Victoria Azarenka
| 0–2
| bgcolor=ffa07a|
| –
| –
| 0–2
| –
| bgcolor=ebc2af align=left|Lost (3–6, 5–7) at 2014 Wimbledon
|-
| align=left |  Jennifer Capriati
| 0–1
| bgcolor=ffa07a|
| –
| 0–1
| –
| –
| bgcolor=ebc2af align=left|Lost (3–6, 1–6) at 2001 French Open
|-
| align=left |  Steffi Graf
| 0–3
| bgcolor=ffa07a|
| 0–1
| 0–1
| 0–1
| –
| bgcolor=ebc2af align=left|Lost (7–6(7–3), 4–6, 3–6) at 1999 Wimbledon
|-
| align=left |  Martina Hingis
| 0–2
| bgcolor=ffa07a|
| 0–1
| 0–1
| –
| –
| bgcolor=ebc2af align=left|Lost (1–6, 2–6) at 2000 Australian Open
|-
| align=left |  Jelena Janković
| 0–1
| bgcolor=ffa07a|
| 0–1
| –
| –
| –
| bgcolor=ebc2af align=left|Lost (4–6, 6–3, 2–6) at 2010 US Open
|-
| align=left |  Angelique Kerber
| 0–4
| bgcolor=ffa07a|
| 0–4
| –
| –
| –
| bgcolor=ebc2af align=left|Lost (2–6, 6–7(6–8)) at 2016 US Open
|-
| align=left |  Naomi Osaka
| 0–1
| bgcolor=ffa07a|
| –
| 0–1
| –
| –
| bgcolor=ebc2af align=left|Lost (3–6, 3–6) at 2016 French Open
|-
| align=left |  Serena Williams
| 0–3
| bgcolor=ffa07a|
| 0–2
| –
| 0–1
| –
| bgcolor=ebc2af align=left|Lost (2–6, 1–6) at 2017 Australian Open
|-
| align=left |  Caroline Wozniacki
| 0–2
| bgcolor=ffa07a|
| 0–2
| –
| –
| –
| bgcolor=ebc2af align=left|Lost (4–6, 4–6) at 2016 Monterrey
|-
|-bgcolor=efefef
| align=left | Number 2 ranked players|| colspan="8" |
|-
| align=left |  Agnieszka Radwańska
| 2–2
| bgcolor=99ccff|
| 2–1
| –
| 0–1
| –
| bgcolor=ccffcc align=left|Won (6–0, 6–3) at 2017 Miami
|-
| align=left |  Svetlana Kuznetsova
| 0–1
| bgcolor=ffa07a|
| –
| 0–1
| –
| –
| bgcolor=ebc2af align=left|Lost (1–6, 3–6) at 2012 French Open
|-
| align=left |  Petra Kvitová
| 0–1
| bgcolor=ffa07a|
| 0–1
| –
| –
| –
| bgcolor=ebc2af align=left|Lost (1–6, ret.) at 2018 Sydney
|-
| align=left |  Li Na
| 0–1
| bgcolor=ffa07a|
| –
| 0–1
| –
| –
| bgcolor=ebc2af align=left|Lost (1–6, 2–6) at 2013 Stuttgart
|-
| align=left |  Jana Novotná
| 0–1
| bgcolor=ffa07a|
| 0–1
| –
| –
| –
| bgcolor=ebc2af align=left|Lost (2–6, 7–6(7–3), 3–6) at 1997 US Open
|-
|-bgcolor=efefef
| align=left | Number 3 ranked players|| colspan="8" |
|-
| align=left |  Mary Pierce
| 1–0
| bgcolor=lime|
| –
| 1–0
| –
| –
| bgcolor=ccffcc align=left|Won (7–5, 6–4) at 1998 Rome
|-
| align=left |  Nathalie Tauziat
| 2–0
| bgcolor=lime|
| –
| 1–0
| 1–0
| –
| bgcolor=ccffcc align=left|Won (4–6, 6–4, 7–5) at 1999 Wimbledon
|-
| align=left |  Amanda Coetzer
| 1–2
| bgcolor=eee8AA|
| 0–2
| 1–0
| –
| –
| bgcolor=ebc2af align=left|Lost (6–4, 6–7(1–7), 2–6) at 1999 Toronto
|-
|-bgcolor=efefef
| align=left | Number 4 ranked players|| colspan="8" |
|-
| align=left |  Kimiko Date-Krumm
| 1–0
| bgcolor=lime|
| 1–0
| –
| –
| –
| bgcolor=ccffcc align=left|Won (2–6, 6–3, 6–2) at 2014 Sydney Qualifying
|-
| align=left |  Kiki Bertens| 1–1
| bgcolor=99ccff|
| 0–1
| 1–0
| –
| –
| bgcolor=ccffcc align=left|Won (7–6(7–5), 6–4) at 2017 Charleston
|-
| align=left | / Jelena Dokic
| 1–1
| bgcolor=99ccff|
| –
| 1–1
| –
| –
| bgcolor=ccffcc align=left|Won (6–2, 6–2) at 2011 Strasbourg
|-
| align=left |  Samantha Stosur| 1–1
| bgcolor=99ccff|
| 1–1
| –
| –
| –
| bgcolor=ccffcc align=left|Won (6–2, 6–1) at 2015 Wuhan
|-
| align=left |  Belinda Bencic| 1–2
| bgcolor=eee8AA|
| 1–1
| –
| 0–1
| –
| bgcolor=ccffcc align=left|Won (7–5, 6–4) at 2017 Acapulco
|-
| align=left |  Dominika Cibulková
| 0–5
| bgcolor=ffa07a|
| 0–2
| 0–1
| 0–2
| –
| bgcolor=ebc2af align=left|Lost (5–7, 3–6) at 2016 Wimbledon
|-
| align=left |  Caroline Garcia| 0–5
| bgcolor=ffa07a|
| 0–3
| 0–2
| –
| –
| bgcolor=ebc2af align=left|Lost (2–6, 4–6) at 2016 Wuhan
|-
| align=left |  Anke Huber
| 0–1
| bgcolor=ffa07a|
| –
| –
| –
| 0–1
| bgcolor=ebc2af align=left|Lost (2–6, 2–6) at 1997 Fed Cup
|-
| align=left |  Iva Majoli
| 0–1
| bgcolor=ffa07a|
| 0–1
| –
| –
| –
| bgcolor=ebc2af align=left|Lost (5–7, 4–6) at 1998 Australian Open
|-
| align=left |  Francesca Schiavone
| 0–2
| bgcolor=ffa07a|
| 0–1
| 0–1
| –
| –
| bgcolor=ebc2af align=left|Lost (1–6, 2–6) at 2012 Strasbourg
|-
|-bgcolor=efefef
| align=left | Number 5 ranked players|| colspan="8" |
|-
| align=left |  Daniela Hantuchová
| 1–0
| bgcolor=lime|
| –
| 1–0
| –
| –
| bgcolor=ccffcc align=left|Won (6–1, 6–2) at 2016 French Open
|-
| align=left |  Sara Errani| 1–2
| bgcolor=eee8AA|
| 1–1
| 0–1
| –
| –
| bgcolor=ccffcc align=left|Won (6–3, 6–4) at 2015 Luxembourg
|-
| align=left |  Lucie Šafářová
| 1–4
| bgcolor=eee8AA|
| 0–2
| 1–2
| –
| –
| bgcolor=ccffcc align=left|Won (7–5, 4–6, 6–3) at 2017 Rome
|-
| align=left |  Anna Chakvetadze
| 0–1
| bgcolor=ffa07a|
| 0–1
| –
| –
| –
| bgcolor=ebc2af align=left|Lost (2–6, 5–7) at 2007 Indian Wells
|-
| align=left |  Jeļena Ostapenko| 0–2
| bgcolor=ffa07a|
| 0–1
| 0–1
| –
| –
| bgcolor=ebc2af align=left|Lost (3–6, 7–5, 4–6) at 2017 Charleston
|-
|-bgcolor=efefef
| align=left | Number 6 ranked players|| colspan="8" |
|-
| align=left |  Maria Sakkari| 1–1
| bgcolor=99ccff|
| 1–1
| –
| –
| –
| bgcolor=ccffcc align=left|Won (3–6, 6–2, 6–3) at 2017 Australian Open
|-
| align=left |  Chanda Rubin
| 0–1
| bgcolor=ffa07a|
| –
| –
| –
| 0–1
| bgcolor=ebc2af align=left|Lost (1–6, 2–6) at 1996 Salzburg
|-
| align=left |  Carla Suárez Navarro
| 0–4
| bgcolor=ffa07a|
| 0–3
| –
| 0–1
| –
| bgcolor=ebc2af align=left|Lost (6–4, 6–7(4–7), 2–6) at 2017 US Open
|-
|-bgcolor=efefef
| align=left | Number 7 ranked players|| colspan="8" |
|-
| align=left |  Marion Bartoli
| 1–0
| bgcolor=lime|
| –
| –
| 1–0
| –
| bgcolor=ccffcc align=left|Won (6–4, 6–3) at 2012 Wimbledon
|-
| align=left |  Anett Kontaveit| 1–1
| bgcolor=99ccff|
| 1–0
| 0–1
| –
| –
| bgcolor=ccffcc align=left|Won (6–4, 6–7(3–7), 6–3) at 2017 New Haven
|-
| align=left |  Patty Schnyder
| 1–1
| bgcolor=99ccff|
| 1–1
| –
| –
| –
| bgcolor=ccffcc align=left|Won (6–3, 6–7(5–7), 6–3) at 1999 Toronto
|-
| align=left |  Roberta Vinci
| 1–2
| bgcolor=eee8AA|
| 0–1
| –
| 1–1
| –
| bgcolor=ebc2af align=left|Lost (3–6, 3–6) at 2015 Toronto
|-
| align=left |  Madison Keys| 0–4
| bgcolor=ffa07a|
| 0–1
| 0–3
| –
| –
| bgcolor=ebc2af align=left|Lost (6–4, 6–7(3–7), 6–7(0–7)) at 2015 Strasbourg
|-
|-bgcolor=efefef
| align=left | Number 8 ranked players|| colspan="8" |
|-
| align=left |  Ekaterina Makarova
| 1–1
| bgcolor=99ccff|
| –
| 1–0
| 0–1
| –
| bgcolor=ebc2af align=left|Lost (1–6, 6–3, 4–6) at 2011 Eastbourne
|-
| align=left |  Alicia Molik
| 1–1
| bgcolor=99ccff|
| 1–1
| –
| –
| –
| bgcolor=ccffcc align=left|Won (7–6(7–5), 6–1) at 2010 US Open
|-
| align=left |  Anna Kournikova
| 0–2
| bgcolor=ffa07a|
| 0–2
| –
| –
| –
| bgcolor=ebc2af align=left|Lost (4–6, 2–6) at 1999 Stanford
|-
|-bgcolor=efefef
| align=left | Number 9 ranked players|| colspan="8" |
|-
| align=left |  Julia Görges
| 1–0
| bgcolor=lime|
| –
| –
| –
| 1–0
| bgcolor=ccffcc align=left|Won (6–4, 5–7, 6–2) at 2014 Quebec City
|-
| align=left |  Brenda Schultz-McCarthy
| 1–0
| bgcolor=lime|
| –
| 1–0
| –
| –
| bgcolor=ccffcc align=left|Won (6–1, 6–4) at 2007 Charleston Qualifying
|-
| align=left |  Sandrine Testud
| 1–0
| bgcolor=lime|
| –
| 1–0
| –
| –
| bgcolor=ccffcc align=left|Won (7–5, ret.) at 1998 Rome
|-
|-bgcolor=efefef
| align=left | Number 10 ranked players|| colspan="8" |
|-
| align=left |  Kristina Mladenovic| 3–1
| bgcolor=#98fb98|
| –
| 3–1
| –
| –
| bgcolor=ebc2af align=left|Lost (4–6, 2–6) at 2017 Stuttgart
|-
| align=left |  Karina Habšudová
| 0–1
| bgcolor=ffa07a|
| 0–1
| –
| –
| –
| bgcolor=ebc2af align=left|Lost (3–6, 6–7(3–7)) at 2001 Miami
|-
| align=left |  Maria Kirilenko
| 0–1
| bgcolor=ffa07a|
| 0–1
| –
| –
| –
| bgcolor=ebc2af align=left|Lost (1–6, 4–6) at 2010 Stanford
|-
|-class=sortbottom style="font-weight:bold; background:#efefef;"
|Total
|37–87
|
|14–50 
|16–22 
|5–13 
|2–2 
|last updated 13 December 2021
|}Notes'''

 active players are in boldface.

Wins over top 10 players

References

External links

 
 
 

1982 births
Living people
Sportspeople from Dortmund
Tennis players from Tampa, Florida
Croatian female tennis players
Croatian emigrants to the United States
Croatian expatriate sportspeople in Germany
Australian Open (tennis) champions
Australian Open (tennis) junior champions
US Open (tennis) junior champions
Grand Slam (tennis) champions in women's doubles
Grand Slam (tennis) champions in girls' singles
Grand Slam (tennis) champions in girls' doubles